Flavius Longinus (Greek: Λογγίνος, floruit 475–491) was a politician of the Eastern Roman Empire, brother of Emperor Zeno and twice consul (in 486 and 490).

Biography 
Longinus came from the region of Isauria, in Asia Minor. His father was called Kodisa (as attested by his brother's patronimic "Tarasicodissa"), his mother was Lallis or Lalis, his wife was a Valeria and he had a daughter called Longina.

When his brother, the Emperor Zeno, was deposed by Basiliscus and pursued by the Imperial army in Isauria (475), Longinus was captured by the Isaurian general Illus and held prisoner for a decade. Illus, who had been a supporter of Basiliscus but later had passed on Zeno's side, used Longinus to keep Zeno under control. In 483, when Zeno requested Longinus' liberation, Illus refused and started the rebellion that led to his death.

After being released in 485, Longinus started a military career, being elevated to the post of magister militum praesentialis (485) and holding the consulate twice, in 486 and 490. He led a military campaign against the Tzans and lavishly donated to the people of Constantinople, paying for four new dancers to the factions of the hippodrome to replace the older ones.

On the death of Zeno in 491, Longinus was one of the possible candidates for the succession, but his Isaurian origin, which had already caused problems to Zeno, disadvantaged him: Ariadne, Zeno's widow, chose Anastasius I, a senior official.

Longinus then instigated a revolt in Isauria, known as the Isaurian War. Anastasius forced him to take vows and sent him into exile in Thebaid (Egypt), later defeating the rebel army (492) led by Longinus of Cardala and finally suppressing the revolt six years later, with the death of the last leader of the rebels, Longinus of Selinus. Longinus' mother retired to a monastery at Brochthi in Bithynia at the news of the exile of her son.

Bibliography 
 Evagrius Scholasticus, The Ecclesiastical History of Evagrius Scholasticus, trad. di Michael Whitby, Liverpool University Press, 2001, pp. 163–165.
 Eiddon, Iorwerth, e Stephen Edwards, The Cambridge Ancient History, Cambridge University Press, 2005, pp. 52–53, 477.
 Jones, Arnold Hugh Martin, John Robert Martindale, John Morris, "Fl. Longinus 6", Prosopography of the Later Roman Empire, volume 1, Cambridge University Press, 1992, p. 689.

5th-century Byzantine people
5th-century Roman consuls
Byzantine rebels
Imperial Roman consuls
Isaurians
Magistri militum
Byzantine generals